{{Infobox person
| name = Alvin Anson
| image = AlvinAnson.jpg
| caption = Alvin Anson receiving his Best Actor Sinag Maynila Award for "Expressway"
| birth_date = 
| birth_name = Alvin Lorenz Cristobal Anson
| birth_place = Metro Manila, Philippines
| occupation = Actor, producer, director, TV host, musician
| known_for =
| yearsactive = 1995–present
| notable_works = Way of the Cross  Expressway  Heneral Luna  Dolce Amore  A Love to Last| height = 
| awards = Sinag Maynila Awards - Best Actor in Expressway| children = 2
| relatives = Boots Anson-Roa (sister)
}}

Alvin Lorenz Cristobal Anson (born October 20, 1962) is a Filipino actor, producer, director, TV host and musician. His works includes his portrayal of General José Alejandrino in the Philippine film Heneral Luna and TV series Dolce Amore as Favio De Luca.

Early life
Anson began his career as a musician and a ledge dancer in various discotheques in the US. His home there housed his own music studio. During the early 90s, his dancing feet was featured on a Swatch commercial.

He holds a degree in Engineering and Liberal Arts and a minor in music from San Francisco State University.

Career
Anson was discovered by a talent caster in a local discotheque in 1995. He was convinced to move back to the Philippines to pursue an acting career. Since then, he bagged supporting roles in several movies, mostly starring Rudy Fernandez and Ronnie Ricketts.

As an actor and producer of independent films, Anson is the producing partner of director Gorio Vicuna, a former Hollywood animator, and his wife Peejay Vicuna in their production house, GWARD, INC.

Personal life
Anson is the son of actor Oscar Moreno, and the younger brother of actress Boots Anson-Roa. He has two daughters, Aliyana and Laisha.

Filmography
Film

Television

Shorts

Awards and nominations
At the Sinag Maynila Independent Film Festival 2016, Anson received the Best Actor Award for his lead portrayal in Ato Bautista's Expressway''.

References

External links

1962 births
Living people
Filipino male film actors
Filipino producers
Male actors from Metro Manila
San Francisco State University alumni